Red White & Screwed is the seventh studio album from American crossover thrash band, M.O.D. It was released in 2007 on Index Entertainment and follows 2003's The Rebel You Love to Hate. After the release of the album Milano disbanded M.O.D., but they returned as a touring unit in 2013 and would not release another album until ten years later.

Track listing
All songs written by Scott Lee Sargeant, Derek Lopez, and Billy Milano

Credits
 Billy Milano – vocals, bass
 Scott Lee Sargeant – guitar, vocals
 Derek Lopez – drums
 Recorded at Musiclab, Austin, Texas, USA
 Engineered by Tim Gerron
 Tech work by Kenneth 'Twizz' Johnson
 Mastered by Jerry Tubb
 Artwork by Sjouke Bakker
 Graphic design & layout by John Warner
 Produced by Tim Gerron, Scott Lee Sargeant, and Billy Milano
 Mixed at Musiclab, Austin, Texas by Tim Gerron, Scott Lee Sargeant, and Billy Milano

References

External links
Metal Archives album page
MOD and SOD official fansite
Official Fansite album page

2007 albums
M.O.D. albums
Nuclear Blast albums